{{DISPLAYTITLE:C12H12N4O3}}
The molecular formula C12H12N4O3 (molar mass: 260.25 g/mol, exact mass: 260.0909 u) may refer to:

 Benznidazole
 Furafylline